is a Japanese musician and voice actress who is currently signed to Office Restart since April 1, 2022. She is the lead vocalist for the band Yōsei Teikoku (under the persona of "Dictator for Life" 終身独裁官, the supreme leader of The Fairy Empire).

Filmography

Television animation
 Da Capo (2003, as Moe Mizukoshi)
 Futakoi (2004, as Kira Sakurazuki)
 My-HiME (2004, as Miya Suzuki)
 Da Capo Second Season (2005, as Moe Mizukoshi)
 Futakoi Alternative (2005, Kira Sakurazuki)
 Mai-Otome (2005, as Miya Clochette)
 Magical Kanan (2005, as Tomoe Takasaki)
 Renkin 3-kyū Magical? Pokān (2006, as Megumi)
 Venus Versus Virus (2007, as Luca)
 Kanokon (2008, as Mio Osakabe)
 Black Butler (2008, as Paula)
 Black Butler II (2010, as Paula)

Video games 
 Arcana Heart series (2008-2014, as Yoriko Yasuzumi)
 True Tears (2006, as Rui Nakane)
 Phantom Brave (as Castile)

References

External links 
  
 Official agency profile 
 Yui Itsuki at GamePlaza-Haruka Voice Acting Database 
 Yui Itsuki at Hitoshi Doi's Seiyuu Database
 

Living people
Japanese video game actresses
Japanese voice actresses
Voice actresses from Aichi Prefecture
1980 births
Japanese women heavy metal singers
Japanese women rock singers